Kalavoor is a village located in National Highway 66 at Alappuzha district in the Indian state of Kerala.

Location
National Highway 66, passes through Kalavoor.

Transportation
It is well-connected by road and rail transportation. The railway station situated roughly 1 km away from the center has passenger services. KSRTC buses including limited and superfast services has stoppages. There is an auto-taxi hub too.

Institutions
 Central Coir Research Institute 
All India Radio Relay Station

Industries
Kalavoor is home to several large scale and small scale industries that extend from Pharmaceuticals to Coir products. Some of the notable industries are :
 Kerala State Drugs and Pharmaceuticals Limited

Demographics
 India census, Kalavoor has a population of 29,808 with 14,458 males and 15,350 females living in 7,385 households. Population of children with age range of 0–6 years, is 2717 which is 9.12% of the total population. The sex ratio of Kalavoor is 1062, lower than the state average of 1087. The child sex ratio is 959, which again is lower than the state average of 964.

Hinduism, Islamism and Christianity are the three major religions found.

Notable people

Ratheesh, Malayalam actor
Kalavoor Ravikumar, Malayalam screenwriter and movie director

External links

Indian Railways, public information website, erail.in.
Census of India 2011 website for demographics data.

References

Villages in Alappuzha district